Honeyeaters and the Australian chats make up the family Meliphagidae. They are a large and diverse family of small to medium-sized birds most common in Australia and New Guinea, but also found in New Zealand, the Pacific islands as far east as Samoa and Tonga, and the islands to the north and west of New Guinea known as Wallacea.

Family: Meliphagidae

Sugomel
 Scaly-crowned honeyeater, Sugomel lombokium (west-central Lesser Sunda Islands)
 Black honeyeater, Sugomel nigrum 
 Myzomela
 Drab myzomela, Myzomela blasii (southern Moluccan Islands of Ceram and Ambon)
 White-chinned myzomela, Myzomela albigula (southeast Papua New Guinea)
 Ruby-throated myzomela, Myzomela eques (New Guinea and the islands of Waigeo, Salawati, Misool, New Britain, and Umboi)
 Dusky honeyeater, Myzomela obscura (northern Moluccas, New Guinea, Aru Islands, northern and northeastern Australia, and southwestern Lesser Sunda Islands)
 Red myzomela, Myzomela cruentata (New Guinea and the Bismarck Archipelago)
 Papuan black myzomela, Myzomela nigrita (New Guinea, Aru Islands and Waigeo island)
 New Ireland myzomela, Myzomela pulchella (New Ireland and the eastern Bismarck Archipelago)
 Mountain myzomela, Myzomela adolphinae (New Guinea)
 Wetar myzomela, Myzomela kuehni (central Lesser Sunda Islands)
 Sumba myzomela, Myzomela dammermani (southwestern Lesser Sunda Islands)
 Red-headed myzomela, Myzomela erythrocephala (southern New Guinea, Aru Islands, and northern Australia)
 Sulawesi myzomela, Myzomela chloroptera (Sulawesi and northern Moluccas)
 Wakolo myzomela, Myzomela wakoloensis (southern Moluccas)
 Banda myzomela, Myzomela boiei (Lesser Sunda Islands, Banda Islands, and Tanimbar Islands)
 Taliabu myzomela, Myzomela wahe (the island of Taliabu)
 Scarlet myzomela, Myzomela sanguinolenta (eastern Australia)
 New Caledonian myzomela, Myzomela caledonica (new Caledonia)
 Micronesian myzomela, Myzomela rubrata (Mariana Islands, Palau, and Caroline Islands)
 Cardinal myzomela, Myzomela cardinalis (southeastern Solomon Islands, Vanuatu, and Samoa)
 Rotuma myzomela, Myzomela chermesina (northwestern Fiji)
 Sclater's myzomela, Myzomela sclateri (small islands off northeast coast of New Guinea and New Britain)
 Bismarck black myzomela, Myzomela pammelaena (Bismarck Archipelago)
 Red-capped myzomela, Myzomela lafargei (Solomon Islands)
 Crimson-rumped myzomela, Myzomela eichhorni (central Solomon Islands)
 Black-headed myzomela, Myzomela melanocephala (Solomon Islands)
 Red-vested myzomela, Myzomela malaitae (southeastern Solomon Islands)
 Sooty myzomela, Myzomela tristrami (southern Solomon Islands)
 Orange-breasted myzomela, Myzomela jugularis (Fiji)
 Black-bellied myzomela, Myzomela erythromelas (Bismarck Archipelago)
 Black-breasted myzomela, Myzomela vulnerata (Lesser Sunda Islands)
 Red-collared myzomela, Myzomela rosenbergi (New Guinea)
 Gliciphila
 Tawny-crowned honeyeater, Gliciphila melanops
 Glycichaera
 Green-backed honeyeater, Glycichaera fallax (Aru Islands, Waigeo and Misool island, New Guinea, northeastern Australia)
 Ptiloprora
 Leaden honeyeater, Ptiloprora plumbea
 Rufous-sided honeyeater, Ptiloprora erythropleura
 Rufous-backed honeyeater, Ptiloprora guisei
 Mayr's honeyeater, Ptiloprora mayri
 Yellowish-streaked honeyeater, Ptiloprora meekiana
 Grey-streaked honeyeater, Ptiloprora perstriata
 Acanthorhynchus
 Eastern spinebill, Acanthorhynchus tenuirostris
 Western spinebill, Acanthorhynchus superciliosus
 Certhionyx
 Pied honeyeater, Certhionyx variegatus (western central Australia)
 Prosthemadera
 Tui or parson bird. Prosthemadera novaeseelandiae
 Anthornis
 New Zealand bellbird, Anthornis melanura
 Pycnopygius 
 Plain honeyeater (Pycnopygius ixoides)
 Marbled honeyeater (Pycnopygius cinereus)
 Streak-headed honeyeater (Pycnopygius stictocephalus)
 Cissomela
 Banded honeyeater, Cissomela pectoralis
 Lichmera
 Olive honeyeater, Lichmera argentauris (Moluccas and western islands of Papua New Guinea)
 Indonesian honeyeater, Lichmera (indistincta) limbata (Lesser Sunda Islands)
 Brown honeyeater, Lichmera indistincta (Aru Islands, central-southern New Guinea, Australia)
 Dark-brown honeyeater, Lichmera incana (New Caledonia, Loyalty Islands, and Vanuatu)
 Scaly-breasted honeyeater, Lichmera squamata (Lesser Sunda Islands and Kai Island)
 Silver-eared honeyeater, Lichmera alboauricularis (north-central and southeastern New Guinea)
 Buru honeyeater, Lichmera deningeri (Buru)
 Seram honeyeater, Lichmera monticola (Seram)
 Flame-eared honeyeater, Lichmera flavicans (Timor)
 Black-necklaced honeyeater, Lichmera notabilis (Wetar)
 Phylidonyris
 Crescent honeyeater, Phylidonyris pyrrhoptera 
 New Holland honeyeater, Phylidonyris novaehollandiae
 White-cheeked honeyeater, Phylidonyris nigra
 Trichodere
 White-streaked honeyeater, Trichodere cockerelli (northeastern Australia)
 Grantiella
 Painted honeyeater, Grantiella picta
 Plectorhyncha
 Striped honeyeater, Plectorhyncha lanceolata 
 Xanthotis
 Spotted honeyeater, Xanthotis polygrammus
 Macleay's honeyeater, Xanthotis macleayanus
 Tawny-breasted honeyeater, Xanthotis flaviventer
 Meliphacator
 Kadavu honeyeater, Meliphacator provocator
 Philemon
 Meyer's friarbird, Philemon meyeri
 Brass's friarbird, Philemon brassi
 Little friarbird, Philemon citreogularis
 Grey friarbird, Philemon kisserensis (sometimes considered as a subspecies of the little friarbird Philemon citreogularis kisserensis)
 Timor friarbird, Philemon inornatus  
 Morotai friarbird, Philemon fuscicapillus
 Seram friarbird, Philemon subcorniculatus
 Buru friarbird, Philemon moluccensis
 Tanimbar friarbird, Philemon plumigenis
 Helmeted friarbird, Philemon buceroides
 New Guinea friarbird, Philemon novaeguineae
 New Britain friarbird, Philemon cockerelli
 New Ireland friarbird, Philemon eichhorni
 Manus friarbird, Philemon albitorques
 Silver-crowned friarbird, Philemon argenticeps
 Noisy friarbird, Philemon corniculatus
 New Caledonian friarbird, Philemon diemenensis
  Melitograis
 White-streaked friarbird, Melitograis gilolensis
 Entomyzon
 Blue-faced honeyeater, Entomyzon cyanotis
 Melithreptus
 Black-chinned honeyeater, Melithreptus gularis
 Strong-billed honeyeater, Melithreptus validirostris
 Brown-headed honeyeater, Melithreptus brevirostris
 White-throated honeyeater, Melithreptus albogularis
 White-naped honeyeater, Melithreptus lunatus
 Gilbert's honeyeater, Melithreptus chloropsis
 Black-headed honeyeater, Melithreptus affinis
 Foulehaio
 Polynesian wattled honeyeater, Foulehaio carunculatus
 Fiji wattled honeyeater, Foulehaio taviunensis
 Kikau, Foulehaio procerior
 Nesoptilotis
 White-eared honeyeater, Nesoptilotis leucotis
 Yellow-throated honeyeater, Nesoptilotis flavicollis
 Ashbyia
Gibberbird, Ashbyia lovensis
 Epthianura
 Crimson chat, Epthianura tricolor
 Orange chat, Epthianura aurifrons
 Yellow chat, Epthianura crocea
 White-fronted chat, Epthianura albifrons
 Melilestes
 Long-billed honeyeater, Melilestes megarhynchus (New Guinea, Aru Islands, western islands of Papua New Guinea)
 Macgregoria
 MacGregor's honeyeater, Macgregoria pulchra
 Melipotes
 Arfak honeyeater, Melipotes gymnops
 Common smoky honeyeater, Melipotes fumigatus
 Wattled smoky honeyeater, Melipotes carolae
 Spangled honeyeater, Melipotes ater
 Timeliopsis
 Olive straightbill, Timeliopsis fulvigula (New Guinea)
 Tawny straightbill, Timeliopsis griseigula (northwestern and southeastern New Guinea)
 Conopophila
 Rufous-banded honeyeater, Conopophila albogularis
 Rufous-throated honeyeater, Conopophila rufogularis
 Grey honeyeater, Conopophila whitei
 Ramsayornis
 Bar-breasted honeyeater, Ramsayornis fasciatus
 Brown-backed honeyeater, Ramsayornis modestus
 Acanthagenys
 Spiny-cheeked honeyeater, Acanthagenys rufogularis
 Anthochaera
 Little wattlebird, Anthochaera chrysoptera
 Western wattlebird, Anthochaera lunulata
 Red wattlebird, Anthochaera carunculata
 Yellow wattlebird, Anthochaera paradoxa
 Regent honeyeater, Anthochaera phrygia
 Bolemoreus
 Bridled honeyeater, Bolemoreus frenatus
 Eungella honeyeater, Bolemoreus hindwoodi
 Caligavis
 Yellow-faced honeyeater, Caligavis chrysops 
 Black-throated honeyeater, Caligavis subfrenata
 Obscure honeyeater, Caligavis obscura
 Lichenostomus
 Yellow-tufted honeyeater, Lichenostomus melanops
 Purple-gaped honeyeater, Lichenostomus cratitius
 Manorina
 Bell miner, Manorina melanophrys
 Noisy miner, Manorina melanocephala
 Yellow-throated miner, Manorina flavigula
 Black-eared miner, Manorina melanotis
 Meliarchus
 Makira honeyeater, Meliarchus sclateri
 Vosea
 Gilliard's honeyeater, Vosea whitemanensis
 Melionyx
 Sooty honeyeater, Melionyx fuscus
 Short-bearded honeyeater, Melionyx nouhuysi
 Long-bearded honeyeater, Melionyx princeps
 Melidectes
 Cinnamon-browed melidectes, Melidectes ochromelas
 Vogelkop melidectes, Melidectes leucostephes
 Yellow-browed melidectes, Melidectes rufocrissalis
 Huon melidectes, Melidectes foersteri
 Belford's melidectes, Melidectes belfordi
 Ornate melidectes, Melidectes torquatus
 Purnella
 White-fronted honeyeater, Purnella albifrons
 Stomiopera
 White-gaped honeyeater, Stomiopera unicolor
 Yellow honeyeater, Stomiopera flavus
 Gavicalis
 Varied honeyeater, Gavicalis versicolor
 Mangrove honeyeater, Gavicalis fasciogularis
 Singing honeyeater, Gavicalis virescens
 Ptilotula
 Yellow-tinted honeyeater, Ptilotula flavescens
 Fuscous honeyeater, Ptilotula fuscus
 Grey-headed honeyeater, Ptilotula keartlandi
 Grey-fronted honeyeater, Ptilotula plumulus
 Yellow-plumed honeyeater, Ptilotula ornatus
 White-plumed honeyeater, Ptilotula penicillatus
 Territornis
 White-lined honeyeater, Territornis albilineata
 Kimberley honeyeater, Territornis fordiana
 Streak-breasted honeyeater, Territornis reticulata
 Microptilotis
 Mottle-breasted honeyeater, Microptilotis mimikae
 Forest honeyeater, Microptilotis montanus
 Mountain honeyeater, Microptilotis orientalis
 Scrub honeyeater, Microptilotis albonotatus
 Mimic honeyeater, Microptilotis analogus
 Tagula honeyeater, Microptilotis vicina
 Graceful honeyeater, Microptilotis gracilis
 Cryptic honeyeater, Microptilotis imitatrix
 Elegant honeyeater, Microptilotis cinereifrons
 Yellow-gaped honeyeater, Microptilotis flavirictus
 Meliphaga
 Puff-backed honeyeater, Meliphaga aruensis
 Yellow-spotted honeyeater, Meliphaga notata
 Lewin's honeyeater, Meliphaga lewinii
 Guadalcanaria
 Guadalcanal honeyeater, Guadalcanaria inexpectata
 Oreornis 
 Orange-cheeked honeyeater, Oreornis chrysogenys (West Papua, Indonesia
 Gymnomyza
 Yellow-billed honeyeater, Gymnomyza viridis
 Giant honeyeater, Gymnomyza brunneirostris
 Mao, Gymnomyza samoensis
 Crow honeyeater, Gymnomyza aubryana
 Myza
 Dark-eared myza, Myza celebensis
 White-eared myza, Myza sarasinorum
 Stresemannia
 Bougainville honeyeater, Stresemannia bougainvillei (Bougainville Island)
 Glycifohia
 Barred honeyeater, Glycifohia undulatus
 White-bellied honeyeater Glycifohia notabilis

References

Further reading

'
Honeyeaters